Bogaert is a Dutch toponymic surname. Bogaert and other spellings, like Bogaard, Bogaardt, Boogaard, Boogaart, and Boomgaert are archaic or regional spellings of boomgaard, meaning "orchard" (possibly indicating a fruit grower). Since the standardization of surnames in the Netherlands, Bogaert as a surname occurs primarily in Belgium; in particular West and East Flanders. People with this surname include:

Bogaert
Annelies Bogaert (born 1949), Dutch politician
Anthony Bogaert (born 1963), Canadian psychologist
 (1910-1988), Dutch road racing cyclist 
Gaston Bogaert (1918-2008), Belgian painter
Hendrick Bogaert (1630-1675), Dutch Golden Age painter
Hendrik Bogaert (born 1968), Flemish politician
Henri Bogaert (born 1948), Belgian economist
Jan Bogaert (born 1957), Belgian road racing cyclist 
Jo Bogaert (born c. 1970), Belgian house/techno musician
 (1752-1820), Flemish publisher and rhetorician
Julien Bogaert (1924–2018), Belgian sprint canoer
Lorenz Bogaert (born 1976), Belgian online media entrepreneur
Lucienne Bogaert (1892-1983), French actress
Nashla Bogaert (born 1986), Dominican actress
Philippe Bogaert (born 1971), Belgian television producer
Teunis Gysbertse Bogaert (1625–1699), ancestor of Humphrey Bogart (1899–1957), government official, husband of Sarah Rapelje of New Netherland
Thierry Bogaert, Belgian molecular biologist and businessman

Bogaerts
Annemie Bogaerts (born 1971), Belgian chemist
Jean Bogaerts (1925–2017), Belgian road racing cyclist 
Marc Bogaerts (born 1951), Belgian choreographer and artistic director
Romain Bogaerts (born 1993), Belgian tennis player
Xander Bogaerts (born 1992), Aruban baseball shortstop for the Boston Red Sox

Van Bogaert
Clément Van Bogaert (1865–1937), Belgian engineer and constructor

Van den/der Bogaert
Bryan Van Den Bogaert (born 1991), Belgian footballer
Jeroen Van den Bogaert (born 1979), Belgian alpine skier
Martin van der Bogaert (1637–1694), Dutch-born French sculptor (a.k.a. "Martin Desjardins")

Van den Bogaerde
Derek Niven van den Bogaerde (1921–1999), English actor and novelist (a.k.a. "Sir Dirk Bogarde")
Jasmine van den Bogaerde (born 1996), English musician, songwriter and singer (a.k.a. "Birdy")

See also
Bogert
Bogart
Bogarde
Boogaard
Van den Boogaard
Baumgart
Baumgartner
Bogard

References

Dutch-language surnames
Dutch toponymic surnames
Surnames of Belgian origin